Utah is a state located in the Western United States. , there are 253 municipalities in the U.S. state of Utah. A municipality is called a town if the population is under 1,000 people, and a city if the population is over 1,000 people. Incorporation means that a municipal charter has been adopted by the affected population following a referendum. In the Constitution of Utah, cities and towns are granted "the authority to exercise all powers relating to municipal affairs, and to adopt and enforce within its limits, local police, sanitary and similar regulations not in conflict with the general law" They also have the power to raise and collect taxes, to provide and maintain local public services, acquire by eminent domain any property needed to make local improvements, and to raise money by bonds.

On July 22, 1847, the first party of Latter-day Saint pioneers arrived in the Salt Lake Valley, where they founded Salt Lake City, the first European settlement in Utah. Over the next 22 years, more than 70,000 pioneers crossed the plains and settled in Utah. Initial colonization along the Wasatch Front was mostly made by members of the Church of Jesus Christ of Latter-day Saints (LDS Church) with no direct involvement from it. Outside the Wasatch Front, most settlements were directed, planned, organized, and dispatched by leaders of the Church. Settlements were also founded by the railroads, mining companies and non-members. Many settlements were named after leaders, history or from scriptures of The Church of Jesus Christ of Latter-day Saints. Natural features of the region, including rivers, mountains, lakes and flora, are also commonly used for names.

The 2017 American Community Survey estimate puts 2,792,531 of the state's 3,101,883 residents within these cities and towns, accounting for 90% of the population. Just over 75% of Utah's population is concentrated in the four Wasatch Front counties of Salt Lake, Utah, Davis, and Weber. The largest city is the state's capital of Salt Lake City with a population of 194,188, and the former coal mining town of Scofield is the smallest town with 15 people.

In 2015, a new form of local government, the metro township, was created. Five unincorporated townships in Salt Lake County voted to incorporate as metro townships, allowing them to elect councils and manage a budget, but they must contract with other cities for municipal services and have limited taxation powers. The five metro townships are Kearns, Magna, Copperton, Emigration Canyon and White City.

List

See also

 List of census-designated places in Utah
 List of ghost towns in Utah
 Utah locations by per capita income

Notes

References

External links
 
 

Utah
Utah
Utah geography-related lists

Lists of places in Utah